The Jawa 660 was a motorcycle, produced by Jawa Moto in the Czech Republic in 2011-2018. The predecessor was the Jawa 650. The motorcycle is made in three versions: the Jawa 660 Sportard, Adenium and Vintage. The Adenium is slightly altered Sportard, main changes include in: 19" front wheel, crash bar, higher front plexiglass, main stand, rear diode light and side trunk carriers. The Vintage is a retro version, produced since 2017 in the design of Jawa 350/634. Since 2014, it was imported through the F2 Motorcycles dealer also to the UK.

Specifications 
 Motor: Minarelli SOHC, water-cooled four-stroke single-cylinder with EFI injection ( same as Yamaha XT660Z Teneré )
 Displacement: 660 cm3
 Power: 36 kW @ 6000 ot./min
 Max. torque: 58 Nm @ 5500 ot./min
 Emission standards: Euro 3
 Frame: tubular steel
 Wheelbase: 1497 mm
 Transmission: five-speed
 Wheels: front 17" 120(130)/70 or 19" 100/90, and rear 17" 150(180)/70(60)
 Brakes: rear disc 220 mm, front 2x discs 305 mm
 Dry weight: 189 kg
 Tank capacity: 15 L
 Max. speed: 170 km/h
 Fuel consumption: 4.5 L/100 km
 Acceleration 0–100 km/h: 5 s

References

External links 
 Official website www.jawa.eu

650
Sport bikes